RhoU (or Wrch1 or Chp2) is a small (~21 kDa) signaling G protein (more specifically a GTPase), and is a member of the Rho family of GTPases.
Wrch1 was identified in 2001 as encoded by a non-canonical Wnt induced gene.
RhoU/Wrch delineates with RhoV/Chp a Rho subclass related to Rac and Cdc42, which emerged in early multicellular organisms during evolution.

Model organisms
				
Model organisms have been used in the study of RhoU function. A conditional knockout mouse line, called Rhoutm1a(KOMP)Wtsi was generated as part of the International Knockout Mouse Consortium program — a high-throughput mutagenesis project to generate and distribute animal models of disease to interested scientists — at the Wellcome Trust Sanger Institute.

Male and female animals underwent a standardized phenotypic screen to determine the effects of deletion. Twenty three tests were carried out on mutant mice, but no significant abnormalities were observed.

References

G proteins
Genes mutated in mice